The Men's 20 kilometre individual biathlon competition at the 1984 Winter Olympics was held on 11 February, at Igman - Veliko Polke.  Each miss resulted in one minute being added to a competitor's skiing time.

Summary 

Frank Ullrich was the two-time defending World champion, and defending Olympic silver medalist, but his ski pace in Sarajevo was a couple of minutes behind the top competitors, and he ended up 5th. The world champion in the 10 km sprint, Eirik Kvalfoss, had the fastest ski time, but missed five shots, ending up with bronze. The gold went to West Germany's Peter Angerer, who had the best shooting record in the competition, and also the second-fastest ski time, leaving him almost a minute-and-a-half clear of his closest pursuer, East German Frank-Peter Roetsch.

Results

References

Men's individual